Connect/Disconnect (Swedish title Kontaktannonsen) is a one-act musical written by Ola Hörling (book and lyrics) and Jan-Erik Sääf (music and lyrics), which received its premiere in 1996 at Artisten in Gothenburg, Sweden. Since then it has toured in Sweden, Denmark and Finland and has been translated and adapted and a second act added by Sääf and Owen Robertson, in which form it has played in London and at the June Havoc Theatre in New York City in July 2009 as part of the Midtown International Theatre Festival, directed by Rick Jacobs and produced by Jacobs and Robert Greer.

Cast 

 Derek Keeling
 Heather Laws

References

External links

Swedish 
 Regionteatern website
 Stage Pool website
 Musikakalandern website
 Riksteatern Skåne website
 Stockholms Musikteater website

English 
 Annual Event
 City Guide NY
 NY Daily News
 Off Off Online
 Playbill
 Theatre Mania
 Theatre Online
 Wingspace

1996 musicals